Dorcadion saulcyi is a species of beetle in the family Cerambycidae. It was described by Thomson in 1865. It is known from Turkey. It contains the varietas Dorcadion saulcyi var. fenestratum.

Subspecies
 Dorcadion saulcyi javeti Kraatz, 1873
 Dorcadion saulcyi saulcyi Thomson, 1865

References

saulcyi
Beetles described in 1865